Lee Aaron Bachler (1925–1979) was an American politician from Anderson, Missouri, who served in the Missouri Senate and the Missouri House of Representatives. He was educated at Pineville High School. Bachler served two years in the Merchant Marines during World War II and in the U.S. Army from 1953 until 1954 during the Korean War.

References

1925 births
1979 deaths
Democratic Party Missouri state senators
20th-century American politicians
People from McDonald County, Missouri